Moutir Chajia (born 6 June 1998) is a Belgian professional footballer of Moroccan descent who plays in Italy as a forward for Como.

Club career 
Chajia arrived to Novara from Oostende in 2015. Chajia made his professional debut for Novara in a Serie B 2–0 loss to SPAL on 4 April 2017.

After the first part of the season in Portuguese club Estoril, on 22 January 2019 Chajia signed a 2.5-year contract with Italian Serie B side Ascoli. On 29 January 2020, he joined Virtus Entella on loan with an option to purchase.

On 13 July 2021, he signed a two-year contract with Italian club Como.

References

External links 
 
 
 Chajia Sky Sports Profile
 Chajia Novara Profile

1998 births
Living people
People from Heusden-Zolder
Belgian footballers
Belgian sportspeople of Moroccan descent
Novara F.C. players
G.D. Estoril Praia players
Ascoli Calcio 1898 F.C. players
Virtus Entella players
NK Lokomotiva Zagreb players
Como 1907 players
Serie B players
Croatian Football League players
Association football forwards
Belgian expatriate sportspeople in Italy
Belgian expatriate sportspeople in Portugal
Belgian expatriate sportspeople in Croatia
Belgian expatriate footballers
Expatriate footballers in Portugal
Expatriate footballers in Italy
Expatriate footballers in Croatia
Footballers from Limburg (Belgium)